Pediasia jucundellus is a species of moth in the family Crambidae described by Gottlieb August Wilhelm Herrich-Schäffer in 1847. It is found on the Balkan Peninsula and in Ukraine, Russia and Central Asia.

References

Moths described in 1847
Crambini
Moths of Europe
Moths of Asia